Lifelong learning is the "ongoing, voluntary, and self-motivated" pursuit of knowledge for either personal or professional reasons. It is important for an individual's competitiveness and employability, but also enhances social inclusion, active citizenship, and personal development.

Development 
In some contexts, the term "lifelong learning" evolved from the term "life-long learners", created by Leslie Watkins and used by Professor Clint Taylor (CSULA) and Superintendent for the Temple City Unified School District's mission statement in 1993, the term recognizes that learning is not confined to childhood or the classroom but takes place throughout life and in a range of situations.

In other contexts, the term "lifelong learning" evolved organically.  The first lifelong learning institute began at The New School for Social Research (now New School University) in 1962 as an experiment in "learning in retirement".  Later, after similar groups formed across the United States, many chose the name "lifelong learning institute" to be inclusive of nonretired persons in the same age range.  See Lifelong learning institutes, or outside the US, University of the Third Age.

During the last fifty years, constant scientific and technological innovation and change has had profound effects on how learning is understood. Learning can no longer be divided into a place and time to acquire knowledge (school) and a place and time to apply the knowledge acquired (the workplace). Instead, learning can be seen as something that takes place on an ongoing basis from our daily interactions with others and with the world around us. It can create and shapeshift into the form of formal learning or informal learning, or self-directed learning. Allen Tough (1979), Canadian educator and researcher, asserts that almost 70% of learning projects are self-planned.

Concept 
Lifelong learning has been described as a process that includes people learning in different contexts. These environments do not only include schools but also homes, workplaces, and even locations where people pursue leisure activities. However, while the learning process can be applied to learners of all ages, there is a focus on adults who are returning to organized learning. There are programs based on its framework that address the different needs of learners, such as United Nations' Sustainable Development Goal 4 and the UNESCO Institute for Lifelong Learning, which caters to the needs of the disadvantaged and marginalized learners.

Lifelong learning focuses on holistic education and it has two dimensions, namely, lifelong and broad options for learning. These indicate learning that integrates traditional education proposals and modern learning opportunities. It also entails an emphasis on encouraging people to learn how to learn and to select content, process, and methodologies that pursues self-design and self-perfection. Some authors highlight that lifelong learning is founded on a different conceptualization of knowledge and its acquisition. It is explained not only as the possession of discrete pieces of information or factual knowledge but also as a generalized scheme of making sense of new events, including the use of tactics in order to effectively deal with them.

Lifelong learning is distinguished from the concept of continuing education in the sense that it has a broader scope. Unlike the latter, which is oriented towards adult education developed for the needs of schools and industries, this type of learning is concerned with the development of human potential, recognizing each individual's capacity for it.

Links to theory 
Two theories of particular relevance when considering lifelong learning are cognitivism and constructivism.  Cognitivism, most notably Gestalt theory, speaks of learning as making sense of the relationship between what is old and what is new.  Similarly, Constructivist theory states that "knowledge is not passively received from the world or from authoritative sources but constructed by individuals or groups making sense of their experiential worlds".  Constructivism lends itself well to Lifelong learning as it brings together learning from many different sources including life experiences.

Learning economy 

Traditional colleges and universities are beginning to recognize the value of lifelong learning outside of the credit and degree attainment model. Some learning is accomplished in segments or interest categories and can still be valuable to the individual and community. The economic impact of educational institutions at all levels will remain significant as individuals continue formal studies and pursue interest-based subjects. Institutions produce educated citizens who buy goods and services in the community and the education facilities and personnel generate economic activity during the operations and institutional activities.  Similar to health facilities, educational institutions are among the top employers in many cities and towns of the world. Whether brick-and-mortar or distance education institutions, there is a great economic impact worldwide from learning, including lifelong learning, for all age groups. The lifelong learners, including persons with academic or professional credentials, tend to find higher-paying occupations, leaving monetary, cultural, and entrepreneurial impressions on communities, according to educator Cassandra B. Whyte.

Contexts 

Although the term is widely used in a variety of contexts, its meaning is often unclear. A learning approach that can be used to define lifelong learning is heutagogy.

There are several established contexts for lifelong learning beyond traditional "brick and mortar" schooling:
Home schooling involves learning to learn or the development of informal learning patterns
Adult education or the acquisition of formal qualifications or work and leisure skills later in life
Continuing education which often describes extension or not-for-credit courses offered by higher education institutions
Lifelong learning institutes, which are groups over 50 years of age which meet for noncredit college-level study for intellectual challenge and social enjoyment 
Knowledge work, which includes professional development and on-the-job training
Personal learning environments or self-directed learning using a range of sources and tools including online applications
E-learning is available at most colleges and universities or to individuals learning independently. Online courses offered for free by many institutions.

One new (2008 and beyond) expression of lifelong learning is the massive open online course (a MOOC), in which a teacher or team offers a syllabus and some direction for the participation of hundreds, sometimes thousands, of learners. Most MOOCs do not offer typical "credit" for courses taken, which is why they are interesting and useful examples of lifelong learning.

Emerging technologies 

Lifelong learning is defined as "all learning activity undertaken throughout life, with the aim of improving knowledge, skills and competences within a personal, civic, social and/or employment-related perspective". It is often considered learning that occurs after the formal education years of childhood (where learning is instructor-driven—pedagogical) and into adulthood (where the learning is individually-driven—andragogical). It is sought out naturally through life experiences as the learner seeks to gain knowledge for professional or personal reasons. These natural experiences can come about on purpose or throughout life's unpredictable course. 'Knowledge results from the combination of grasping experience and transforming it' (Kolb 1984: 41). 
The concept of lifelong learning has become of vital importance with the emergence of new technologies that change how we receive and gather information, collaborate with others, and communicate.

Assistive technology

As technology rapidly changes, individuals must adapt and learn to meet everyday demands.  However, throughout life, an individual's functional capacities may also change.  Assistive technologies are also important considerations under the umbrella of emerging technology and lifelong learning.  Access to informal and formal learning opportunities for individuals with disabilities may be dependent upon low and high tech assistive technology.

Internet

The emergence of internet technologies has great potential to support lifelong learning endeavors, allowing for informal, just-in-time, day-to-day learning. Constant change is emerging as the new normal. To thrive, organizations and individuals must be able to adjust, and enhance their knowledge and skills to meet evolving needs. This means the most important thing someone can learn is how to learn. An understanding of web tools is critical to keeping up with a changing world and the information explosion.

Workplace learning

Professions typically recognize the importance of developing practitioners becoming lifelong learners.  Nowadays, formal training is only a beginning. Knowledge accumulates at such a fast rate that one must continue to learn to be effective (Williams, 2001). Many licensed professions mandate that their members continue learning to maintain a license.  (Merriam, Caffarella, & Baumgartner, 2007). Having said this, what are the characteristics or skills that a lifelong learner must develop.  Reflective learning and critical thinking can help a learner to become more self-reliant through learning how to learn, thus making them better able to direct, manage, and control their own learning process (Candy, 1990). Sipe (1995) studied experimentally "open" teachers and found that they valued self-directed learning, collaboration, reflection, and challenge; risk taking in their learning was seen as an opportunity, not a threat.  Dunlap and Grabinger (2003) say that for higher education students to be lifelong learners, they must develop a capacity for self-direction, metacognition awareness, and a disposition toward learning (Merriam, Caffarella, & Baumgartner, 2007).

Metacognition 
While the study of metacognition originally gave educational psychologists insights into what differentiated successful students from their less successful peers, it is increasingly being used to inform teaching that aims to make students more aware of their learning processes, and show them how to regulate those processes for more effective learning throughout their lives.

Educators can employ Cognitive Strategy Instruction (CSI) as a means to help learners develop their metacognition. Again, learners who are better equipped to create learning strategies for themselves will have more success in achieving their cognitive goals.

As lifelong learning is "lifelong, lifewide, voluntary, and self-motivated" learning to learn, that is, learning how to recognize learning strategies, and monitor and evaluate learning, is a pre-condition for lifelong learning. Metacognition is an essential first step in developing lifelong learning.

Delors Report and the four pillars of learning 

The Delors Report proposed an integrated vision of education based on two key paradigms: lifelong learning and the four pillars of learning. The report proposed a holistic conceptual framework of learning, that of the 'four pillars of learning'. It argued that formal education tends to emphasize the acquisition of knowledge to the detriment of other types of learning essential to sustaining human development. It stressed the need to think of learning over the life course, and to address how everyone can develop relevant skills, knowledge and attitudes for work, citizenship and personal fulfillment. The four pillars of learning are:
 Learning to know
 Learning to do
 Learning to be
 Learning to live together
It is important to note that the four pillars of learning were envisaged against the backdrop of the notion of 'lifelong learning', itself an adaptation of the concept of 'lifelong education' as initially conceptualized in the 1972 Faure publication Learning to Be.

In practice

In India and elsewhere, the "University of the Third Age" (U3A) provides an example of the almost spontaneous emergence of autonomous learning groups accessing the expertise of their own members in the pursuit of knowledge and shared experience. No prior qualifications and no subsequent certificates feature in this approach to learning for its own sake and, as participants testify, engagement in this type of learning in later life can indeed 'prolong active life'.

In Sweden the successful concept of study circles, an idea launched almost a century ago, still represents a large portion of the adult education provision. The concept has since spread, and for instance, is a common practice in Finland as well. A study circle is one of the most democratic forms of a learning environment that has been created. There are no teachers and the group decides on what content will be covered, scope will be used, as well as a delivery method.

Sometimes lifelong learning aims to provide educational opportunities outside standard educational systems—which can be cost-prohibitive, if available at all. On the other hand, formal administrative units devoted to this discipline exist in a number of universities. For example, the 'Academy of Lifelong Learning' is an administrative unit within the University-wide 'Professional and Continuing Studies' unit at the University of Delaware. Another example is the Jagiellonian University Extension (Wszechnica Uniwersytetu Jagiellonskiego), which is one of the most comprehensive Polish centers for lifelong learning (open learning, organizational learning, community learning).

In recent years, 'lifelong learning' has been adopted in the UK as an umbrella term for post-compulsory education that falls outside of the UK higher education system—further education, community education, work-based learning and similar voluntary, public sector and commercial settings.

Most colleges and universities in the United States encourage lifelong learning to non-traditional students.  Professional licensure and certification courses are also offered at many universities, for instance for teachers, social services providers, and other professionals. Some colleges even enable adults to earn credit for the college-level learning gained through work, volunteer and other experiences.

Bangladesh Open University (BOU) has six schools and is offering 23 formal and 19 nonformal programs. The number of enrolled students in formal programs for 2016 was 433,413. Most of the courses of BOU are for professional development and most of the students are professional people who are getting scope to study in flexible hours. BOU is the only public institution in the country that imparts education in distance mode. In place of campus based teaching, this university uses technology including electronic devices to reach people in different corners of the country.

In Canada, the federal government's Lifelong Learning Plan allows Canadian residents to withdraw funds from their Registered Retirement Savings Plan to help pay for lifelong learning, but the funds can only be used for formal learning programs at designated educational institutions.

Priorities for lifelong and lifewide learning have different priorities in different countries, some placing more emphasis on economic development (towards a learning economy) and some on social development (towards a learning society). For example, the policies of China, Republic of Korea, Singapore and Malaysia promote lifelong learning in a human resource development (HRD) perspective. The governments of these countries have done much to foster HRD whilst encouraging entrepreneurship.

Impact on long-term economic growth 
Mainstream economic analysis has highlighted increased levels of primary and secondary education as a key driver of long-term economic growth. Data show that initial levels of educational attainment explain about half the difference in growth rates between East Asia and sub- Saharan Africa between 1965 and 2010. At the individual level, the knowledge and skills workers acquire through education and training make them more productive. Provision of good quality education can improve the knowledge and skills of a whole population beyond what traditional or informal systems can achieve. For business, educated and highly skilled workers foster productivity gains and technological change, through either innovation or imitation of processes developed elsewhere. At the societal level, education expansion helps build social and institutional capital, which has a strong impact on the investment climate and growth; it also helps in building social trust, developing participatory societies, strengthening the rule of law and supporting good governance.

Implications for an aging society 
According to the Alzheimer's Society, it is estimated that worldwide cases of Alzheimer's diseases will jump from 47.5 million as of 2014 to 75.6 million by 2030. "Exercising the brain may preserve it, forestalling mental decline" (Grady, 2012).
In North America—and presumably globally—to proactively curb potential economic issues as the baby boomers continue to age, we need to look at society through a lifelong learning lens.  Consider community programs to engage retirees and foster their cognitive health. Taking a proactive approach to keep our elderly population engaged through learning and their brains exercised as Grady described, the strain on the health care system and not to mention the families of the elderly would be lessened. The US Department of Health and Human Service published a study that suggests that older people with a mild cognitive impairment receive 8.5 hours more of care each week from their family and those with a severe impairment received 41.5 more hours than those without a cognitive impairment (USDHHS, 2007).  Who pays for this?
As a society we are living longer—85 years for men and 90 years for women—making cognitive health vitally important.

See also

Brain fitness
Community college
Experiential education
Folk high school
Folkbildning, an approach to community education in Scandinavia
Knud Illeris, professor of lifelong learning and author of How We Learn and Contemporary Theories of Learning 
Learning
Learning community
Osher Lifelong Learning Institutes
Part-time learner in higher education
Right to education
Self-paced instruction
TVET (Technical and Vocational Education and Training)
Vocational education
Widening participation
Workers' Educational Association

References

Sources 
 Grady, D., (2012, March 7).  Exercising an aging brain.  New York Times.  Retrieved from https://www.nytimes.com/2012/03/08/business/retirementspecial/retirees-are-using-education-to-exercise-an-aging-brain.html .
 US Department of Health and Human Services. (2007) Growing older in America:  the health and retirement study.  Retrieved from http://hrsonline.isr.umich.edu/sitedocs/databook-2006/inc/pdf/HRS-Growing-Older-in-America.pdf
 Yilmaz, K. (2008). Constructivism: Its theoretical underpinnings, variations, and implications for classroom instruction. Educational HORIZONS, Spring.

Further reading

John Field, Lifelong Learning and the New Educational Order (Trentham Books, 2006) 
Charles D. Hayes, The Rapture of Maturity: A Legacy of Lifelong Learning (2004)  
Charles D. Hayes, Beyond the American Dream: Lifelong Learning and the Search for Meaning in a Postmodern World (1998) 
Pastore G., Un'altra chance. Il futuro progettato tra formazione e flessibilità, in Mario Aldo Toscano, Homo instabilis. Sociologia della precarietà, Grandevetro/Jaca Book, Milano 2007 
William A. Draves and Julie Coates ''Nine Shift: Work, life, and education in the 21st Century (2004) 

 
Alternative education
Philosophy of education
Educational psychology
Personal development
Educational stages
Education reform